Paulo Vinícius Souza dos Santos (born 21 February 1990) is a professional footballer who plays as a centre back for Greek Super League club Levadiakos and the Hungary national team. He was born in Brazil, and became a Hungarian citizen on 10 March 2017 and thus eligible to play internationally for Hungary.

International career
Vinícius was called up to the Hungary national football team, after gaining his Hungarian citizenship in 2017.

Club statistics

References

1990 births
Living people
Hungarian people of Brazilian descent
Footballers from São Paulo
Hungarian footballers
Hungary international footballers
Hungarian expatriate footballers
Hungarian expatriate sportspeople in Uruguay
Hungarian expatriate sportspeople in Cyprus
Hungarian expatriate sportspeople in Greece
Brazilian footballers
Association football defenders
São Paulo FC players
Club Atlético River Plate (Montevideo) players
Fehérvár FC players
APOEL FC players
Levadiakos F.C. players
Uruguayan Primera División players
Nemzeti Bajnokság I players
Cypriot First Division players
Super League Greece players
Brazilian expatriate footballers
Brazilian expatriate sportspeople in Uruguay
Brazilian expatriate sportspeople in Hungary
Brazilian expatriate sportspeople in Cyprus
Brazilian expatriate sportspeople in Greece
Expatriate footballers in Uruguay
Expatriate footballers in Hungary
Expatriate footballers in Cyprus
Expatriate footballers in Greece
Naturalized citizens of Hungary
Brazilian emigrants to Hungary